The Dălghiu is a left tributary of the river Buzău in Romania. It discharges into the Buzău upstream from Vama Buzăului.

References

Rivers of Romania
Rivers of Brașov County